Striatodecospora is a genus of fungi in the family Xylariaceae. This is a monotypic genus, containing the single species Striatodecospora bambusae.

References

External links
Index Fungorum

Xylariales
Monotypic Ascomycota genera